The Dynamis Ensemble originated in 1999 in Milan, Italy, from a group of musicians already active within the framework of international concerts, joined by an intense passion for the knowledge and diffusion of contemporary music and 20th-century composers.

Since then, the group has established in Italian contemporary music circles regarding their performance, precision and technical skills, frequently combining the music of young composers with the works of the masters.
In addition, the Dynamis Ensemble has performed in numerous concerts at important cultural centres, both in Italy and abroad, such as Festival Milano Musica, Aspekte Salzburg, Mostra Sonora Sueca (Spain), Festival Internacional Cervantino (Mexico), International Forum of Cultures UNESCO Monterrey (Mexico), and Forum Neue Musik Luzern.

The ensemble often performs world premieres of musical works, including the interaction of electro-acoustics and multimedia in their performances.
The Dynamis Ensemble collaborates with composers such as Jonathan Harvey, Alessandro Solbiati, and Javier Torres Maldonado.

Discography
Stradivarius (STR 33718) Javier Torres Maldonado: Tiento, for cello and electronics, 2004, Edizioni Suvini Zerboni, Milano.
Stradivarius (STR 33719) Javier Torres Maldonado: The unexpected clock in the mirrors, for violin, bass-clarinet and ensemble. Carlo Chiarappa, violin, Rocco Parisi, bass-clarinet, Javier Torres Maldonado, conductor, 2005, Edizioni Nuova Stradivarius, Milano.
Stradivarius (STR 33723) Javier Torres Maldonado: Orior, for fortepiano, 2005, Universal Edition.
Stradivarius (STR 33719) Javier Torres Maldonado: De ignoto cantu, for ensemble and electronics.  Javier Torres Maldonado, conductor, 2005, Edizioni Suvini Zerboni, Milano.

External links
 Dynamis Ensemble website
 Stradivarius, music recordings and publisher of Milan
 Jonathan Harvey's website
 Official website of Javier Torres Maldonado
 Suvini Zerboni, music publisher of Milan
 Ricordi, music publisher of Milan
 Faber music

Musical groups established in 1999
Italian musical groups
Musical groups from Milan
Classical music in Italy
Italian classical musicians
Contemporary classical music ensembles
1999 establishments in Italy